Saint Cloud High School is a high school in St. Cloud, Florida.

History

Founded in 1909 as a small school and grew over the years, also growing in value.

Campus
The Saint Cloud High School campus is large in size. It completed its renovation in 2012.

Curriculum
In addition to the state standard curriculum, Saint Cloud High School offers vocational courses and Army JROTC.

Extracurricular activities
Student groups and activities at Saint Cloud High School include art club, Best Buddies, choir, Marching Band, Golden Girls Dance Team, Theatre Club, FCCLA, HOSA, National Honor Society, student council, JROTC, and yearbook.

The school's athletic teams, known as the St. Cloud Bulldogs, compete in baseball, basketball, cheerleading, cross country, football, golf, soccer, softball, swimming, tennis, track and field, volleyball, weightlifting, and wrestling.

Harmony High School and Osceola High School are their rivals.

Demographics (As of 2019)
Gender
Male: 49.7%
Female: 50.3%

Race and Ethnicity 
Black: 6.2%
Caucasian: 36.95%
Mixed: 2.5%
Asian: 1.8%
American Indian or Alaskan: 0.4%
Pacific Islander: 0.05%
Hispanic or Latino of any race: 52.1%

References

Osceola County Public Schools
Education in St. Cloud, Florida
Educational institutions established in 1909
High schools in Osceola County, Florida
Public high schools in Florida
1909 establishments in Florida